Zahir Al-Aghbari (born 28 May 1999) is an Omani professional football player who plays as a winger for Mes Rafsanjan.

References

External links

1999 births
Living people
Omani footballers
Oman international footballers
Association football midfielders
Al-Seeb Club players
Mes Rafsanjan players